Sadistic Intentions, originally known as Sadistic Intent, is a 2018 American horror romance film directed by Eric Pennycoff and starring Jeremy Gardner, Michael Patrick Nicholson and Taylor Zaudtke.

Cast
Taylor Zaudtke as Chloe
Jeremy Gardner as Stu
Michael Patrick Nicholson as Kevin
Larry Fessenden as Father
Jessica Freestone as Mother
Stephanie Short as Daughter
Jason Walter Short as Son

Release
The film premiered at the Knoxville Horror Film Fest on 20 October 2018.

Reception
Phil Wheat of Nerdly rated the film 4.5 stars out of 5. Both Matt Hudson of HorrorNews.net and film critic Kim Newman wrote positive reviews of the film.

Meagan Navarro of Bloody Disgusting was more critical of the film, rating it 2.5 out of 5.

References

External links
 
 

American horror films
2018 horror films